The adjective  (usually abbreviated to ), German for imperial–royal, was applied to the authorities and state institutions of the Austrian Empire until the Austro-Hungarian Compromise of 1867, which established the Austro-Hungarian Empire. Thereafter the abbreviation  only applied to institutions of the so-called Cisleithania (i.e. those lands not part of the Lands of the Crown of Saint Stephen/Transleithania: Hungary and Croatia-Slavonia; Bosnia and Herzegovina, annexed in 1878 from the Ottoman Empire, was a condominium of Cis- and Transleithania). Contrary to the regulations, the Common Army continued to use the  abbreviation  to describe itself until 1889.

The prefix  only properly referred to the authorities and institutions of both halves of the empire. The first  ( = "imperial") referred to the Emperor of Austria. In , the second  ( = "royal", literally "kingly") referred, from 1867, to the King of Bohemia (the Kingdom of Bohemia/Lands of the Bohemian Crown were part of Cisleithania). In , the second  referred to the King of Hungary. Both the titles King of Bohemia and King of Hungary were borne by the Emperor.

Terms used in other languages of the monarchy

See also 
 Croatian–Hungarian Settlement

References 

Austrian Empire
Austria-Hungary
Austria–Czech Republic relations